Ignaz Ziegler (29 September 1861 in Dolný Kubín, then Hungary – 1948) was an Austrian-Czech rabbi, chief rabbi of Karlovy Vary.

He was educated at the Budapest University of Jewish Studies and at the University of Budapest (Ph.D. 1888). Immediately after his graduation he was called to the rabbinate of Carlsbad. Through his efforts the Kaiser Franz Josef Regierungs-Jubiläum Hospiz was erected at Carlsbad, at a cost of 500,000 Austrian crowns, to provide food, shelter, and medical treatment for indigent Jews who come to that city in large numbers in search of health. This institution was opened on 1 May 1903.

Ziegler's works are as follows:
 a Hungarian dissertation on the prophet Malachi (Budapest, 1888)
 Religiöse Disputationen im Mittelalter (Frankfort-on-the-Main, 1894)
 Geschichte des Judentums (Prague, 1900)
 Die Königsgleichnisse im Midrasch (Breslau, 1903)

References 
 
 Ignaz Ziegler, Museum of the Jewish people site
 Raphael Patai "Apprentice in Budapest: Memories of a World That Is No More"
 https://web.archive.org/web/20110717214008/http://www.virtualjudaica.com/Item/15108/Ein_Volksbuch_uber_die_Propheten_Israels

External links
 

Austro-Hungarian rabbis
20th-century Austrian rabbis
Czech rabbis
Chief rabbis of cities
Hungarian Jews
Hungarian expatriates in the Czech lands
Czech people of Hungarian descent
People from Dolný Kubín
People from Karlovy Vary
1861 births
1948 deaths